The Arrington Ice Arena is a 500-seat ice arena located in Adrian, Michigan on the campus of Adrian College. The ice arena is also the home to a number of Adrian Bulldog Athletic teams:
 AC Men's Varsity Ice Hockey competing in NCAA DIII as a member of the Northern Collegiate Hockey Association.
 AC Women's Varsity Ice Hockey competing in NCAA DIII as a member of the Northern Collegiate Hockey Association.
 AC Men's ACHA Division 1 competing in the American Collegiate Hockey Association as a member of the Great Lakes Collegiate Hockey League.
 AC Men's ACHA Division 2 competing in the American Collegiate Hockey Association as a member of the Great Midwest Hockey League.
 AC Men's ACHA Division 3 competing in the American Collegiate Hockey Association as a member of the Michigan Collegiate Hockey Conference. 
 AC Women's ACHA Division 1 competing in the American Collegiate Hockey Association as a member of the Central Collegiate Women's Hockey Association.
 AC Women's ACHA Division 2 competing in the American Collegiate Hockey Association as a member of the Central Collegiate Women's Hockey Association.
 AC Synchronized Skating Team.

Facilities
The Ice Arena includes a NHL regulation-sized ice sheet and has a seating capacity of 500 spectators, a media press box, a president's seating area, concession stand, pro shop with skate rental. The arena also houses offices for ice sports coaches and personnel and locker rooms.

References

External links
Official Site

Buildings and structures in Adrian, Michigan
Adrian College
Indoor ice hockey venues in Michigan
College ice hockey venues in the United States
Sports venues completed in 2007
2007 establishments in Michigan